Morley Currie (June 23, 1869 – July 11, 1944) was an Ontario physician and political figure. He represented Prince Edward in the Legislative Assembly of Ontario from 1902 to 1908 and in the House of Commons of Canada from 1908 to 1911 as a Liberal member.

He was born in Picton, Ontario, the son of George Currie and Catharine Richards, and studied at the University of Toronto, receiving his M.D. in 1895. Currie served as house surgeon for the Metropolitan Society Lying-in Hospital in New York City, later practicing in Toronto and finally Picton. He married Clara Clarke in 1904. Currie was surgeon and captain in the Prince Edward County militia. He was defeated when he ran for reelection in 1911. Currie died in Picton at the age of 75.

References

External links

1869 births
1944 deaths
Liberal Party of Canada MPs
Members of the House of Commons of Canada from Ontario
Ontario Liberal Party MPPs
People from Prince Edward County, Ontario
Physicians from Ontario
University of Toronto alumni
19th-century Canadian physicians
20th-century Canadian physicians